Julius S. Berg (July 12, 1893 – July 20, 1938) was an American lawyer and politician from New York.

Life
He was born on July 12, 1893, in Manhattan, New York City, the son of Morris Berg and Celia (Weinstein) Berg. He attended the public schools, and for one year New York University. He practiced law in New York City. On June 20, 1920, he married Rose Schram.

Berg was a member of the New York State Assembly (Bronx Co., 3rd D.) in 1923, 1924, 1925, 1926, 1927, 1928, 1929 and 1930. He was Commander-in-Chief of the Jewish War Veterans of the United States of America from 1928 to 1930.

He was a member of the New York State Senate (22nd D.) from 1931 until his death in 1938, sitting in the 154th, 155th, 156th, 157th, 158th, 159th, 160th and 161st New York State Legislatures.

On July 20, 1938, he committed suicide by shooting himself in his office at 1650 Broadway in Manhattan while a grand jury was going to hand down an indictment on 17 counts of grand larceny and embezzlement. His wife claimed that Berg shot himself because of ill health.

Sources

1893 births
1938 suicides
Democratic Party New York (state) state senators
Democratic Party members of the New York State Assembly
American politicians who committed suicide
Suicides by firearm in New York City
New York University alumni
20th-century American politicians
Politicians from the Bronx